Agawam is an unincorporated community in Teton County, in the U.S. state of Montana.

History
A post office was established at Agawam in 1913, and remained in operation until it was discontinued in 1956. The community took its name after Agawam, Massachusetts.

Agawam was home to the terminus station for the Milwaukee Road Northern Montana Division.

References

Unincorporated communities in Teton County, Montana
Unincorporated communities in Montana